Haryana Raxil drug purchase scam case is a case under investigation by the Central Vigilance Commission (CVC) and the Central Bureau of Investigation (CBI) against Bhupinder Singh Hooda for the illegal purchase of Raxil fungicide which resulted in INR80 crore (800 million) loss to the government. This scam, initially exposed by Ashok Khemka, is also pending in the Punjab and Haryana High Court.

There are a total of 6 CBI cases and several other vigilance department investigations against Hooda underway. Central Bureau of Investigation is investigating several scams, mostly related to illegal land grab, that took place during his rule in Haryana. These investigations include the Gurugram-Manesar IMT land scam, Robert Vadra DLF land grab scam, Gurugram Rajiv Gandhi Trust land grab scam, Sonepat-Kharkhoda IMT land scam case, Garhi Sampla Uddar Gagan land scam, Panchkula-HUDA Industrial plots allotment scam, AJL-National Herald Panchkula land grab scam and Haryana Forestry scam case. He has been already chargesheeted in the Manesar-Gurugram land scam, while other cases are still under investigation (c. March 2018).

Details

Modus of scam
Raxil, manufactured by Bayer, is used to treat the seeds for Karnal bunt. Hooda government had purchased Raxil worth INR 100 crore for the treatment of seeds to be distributed to the farmers. Raxil, which is not registered with the Pesticide Management Board and costs INR1350 per kg, was preferred over the generic brands which cost only INR300 per kg. In spite of this, Raxil was the sole drug recommended by the Hooda administration. As a result, there is a High Court case underway for causing the loss to government for preferring only one drug, that too an unregistered and expensive drug, over other drugs. Use of Raxil was discontinued by the new BJP govenrmnet, case was referred to Parliamentary Standing committee, CVC and High Court, as well as to CBI.

Current status: CBI inquiry
After the initial inquiry by the Central Vigilance Commission (CVC), subsequently, Chief Minister Manohar Lal Khattar's BJP Government of Haryana referred the case to CBI to conduct further investigation against Hooda and others. Taking cognizance of the reference sent by Haryana government regarding the alleged multi-crore fungicide (RAXIL) purchase scam, the Union Government issued a notification on Thursday for a probe by the Central Bureau of Investigation (CBI) into the case. Haryana asked for a CBI investigation into the alleged financial corruption as well as the into the reasons under which "the then MD, HSDC, Ashok Khemka was prematurely transferred out of HSDC on April 4 and a junior departmental officer BS Duggal was posted as MD, HSDC".

See also
 Corruption in India
 National Herald scam
 Rajiv Gandhi Charitable Trust land grab cases
 Robert Vadra land grab cases
 List of scams in India

References

21st-century scandals
Political corruption in India
Corruption in India
Indian National Congress of Haryana
Trials in India
Corruption in Haryana
Cover-ups
Criminal investigation
Lawsuits